John Bowles (or Bockle, alias John Ramsey) (d. 15 August 1558) was a Canon of Windsor from 1557 to 1558.

Career

He was a fellow of All Souls College, Oxford.

He was appointed:
Prior of Merton Priory Surrey (the last)

He was appointed to the first stall in St George's Chapel, Windsor Castle in 1557, and held the stall until 1558.

Notes 

Year of birth unknown
1558 deaths
Canons of Windsor
Augustinian friars
16th-century English Roman Catholic priests